Neue Ruhr Zeitung (abbreviated NRZ) is a regional newspaper based in Essen, Germany. The paper was first published by Ruhr-Verlag, G.m.b.H., on 13 July 1946. The founder and editor of the paper was Dietrich Oppenberg. From 1 September 1949 it became a daily newspaper except Sundays. Neue Ruhr Zeitung is published on weekdays and serves the regions of Rhine Ruhr and Lower Rhine.

References

External links

1946 establishments in Germany
Daily newspapers published in Germany
German-language newspapers
Mass media in Essen
Newspapers established in 1946